Al-Adab al-Kabīr is an Arabic book by Abdullah Ibn al-Muqaffa, written about Persian manners and court etiquette. Some researchers (e.g. al-ʿĀmerī) believe that the content of this book is based on Avesta’s moral precepts. However, according to Iranica, many of the sayings included in that book occur in Greek gnomonology. One part of the work deals with rulers and the court etiquette, and the other part deals with the behavior in society.

References
 
 

8th-century Arabic books
Islamic mirrors for princes